D72 may refer to:

D. 72, Wind Octet in F major for two oboes, two clarinets, two horns and two bassoons by Franz Schubert
HMS Ruler (D72), Ruler-class escort aircraft carrier of the British Royal Navy during World War II
HMS Veteran (D72), Admiralty modified W-class destroyer built for the Royal Navy